The 1876 Penn Quakers football team represented the University of Pennsylvania in the 1876 college football season. They finished with a 1–2 record. This was the first season for the Penn Quakers football team.

Schedule

See also
 List of the first college football game in each US state

References

Penn
Penn Quakers football seasons
Penn Quakers football